Mahāpratisarā (Ch: 大随求菩薩; pinyin: Dàsuíqiú; Jp: Daizuigu) is a bodhisattva belonging to the Mahayana and Vajrayana sects of Buddhism. She is sometimes presented as the consort of Vairocana.

Notes

Bodhisattvas